Cahir Healy (born 27 December 1986) is an Irish dual player. He plays hurling and football with his local club Portlaoise. He has played hurling and football at inter-county level with Laois although he is currently focusing on hurling.

Career
Cahir Healy, also known as the "music man" (because of his amazing singing) is a Laois dual Star, who predominantly lines out in defence.

Cahir was part of the Laois team that won the All-Ireland Minor Football Championship title in 2003. Laois have won three Minor Football title's, the other two were in 1997 and 1996.

In 2004, he was part of the Laois minor team which won the Leinster Minor Football Championship and in the same year, Cahir was on the Portlaoise Senior Hurling team that won the Laois county championship.

In 2006 and again in 2007, Cahir was part of the Laois team that won the Leinster Under-21 Football Championship.

In 2007 Cahir was also part of the Laois hurling team that won the National Hurling League Division 2 in 2007.

At club level, Cahir usually lines out as a defender with Portlaoise. Cahir has won eleven County (1 hurling and 10 football) and two Leinster club football titles.

At the start of 2013 he left the Laois footballers and committed to the Laois hurlers.

In 2019, Cahir reversed this decision and decided to commit to the Laois GAA football panel under the management of John Sugrue. Unfortunately the year was very short lived as his ACL ruptured. Cahir would have been an instrumental part in the panel, the Laois supporters wish Cahir well in his recovery and hope to see him back on the pitch soon.

During Healy's hurling and football career, he also works as a primary school teacher in south west London. He usually flew to Ireland and back every weekend before he had his leg injury in 2019.

Honours
Portlaoise
 Laois Senior Hurling Championship (1): 2004
 Laois Senior A Hurling Championship (2): 2015, 2018
 Laois Senior Football Championship (12): 2004, 2007, 2008, 2009, 2010, 2011, 2012, 2013, 2014, 2015, 2017, 2018
 Leinster Senior Club Football Championship (2): 2004, 2009

Laois
 Leinster Minor Football Championship (1): 2004
 All-Ireland Minor Football Championship (1): 2003
 Leinster Under-21 Football Championship (2): 2006, 2007
 National Hurling League, Division 2 (1): 2007

References 

Living people
1986 births
Donegal Boston Gaelic footballers
Portlaoise hurlers
Portlaoise Gaelic footballers
Laois inter-county hurlers
Laois inter-county Gaelic footballers
Dual players
Irish schoolteachers
People from Portlaoise